Melvin Roy Fritzel (July 13, 1906 – May 3, 1985) was an American football and basketball player and coach. He served as the head football coach at William Penn College—now known as William Penn University—in Oskaloosa, Iowa from 1933 to 1934, compiling a record of 4–10–1. He was head basketball coach at his alma mater, Iowa State Teachers College—now known as the University of Northern Iowa, in 1932–33, tallying a mark of 9–4.

Head coaching record

Football

References

External links
 

1906 births
1985 deaths
Northern Iowa Panthers football players
Northern Iowa Panthers men's basketball coaches
Northern Iowa Panthers men's basketball players
William Penn Statesmen football coaches
William Penn Statesmen men's basketball coaches
People from Grundy County, Iowa
Coaches of American football from Iowa
Players of American football from Iowa
Basketball coaches from Iowa
Basketball players from Iowa